A V14 engine is a V engine with 14 cylinders mounted on the crankcase in two banks of seven cylinders. It is a very rare layout, used almost exclusively on large medium-speed diesel engines used for power generation and marine propulsion.

Marine use 
MAN V14 engines have been installed on cruise ships such as the Explorer Dream and Norwegian Spirit, both of which have 14V48/60 engines producing  each, and on some cargo vessels. However, other major manufacturers do not normally offer medium-speed engines in the V14 configuration.

Wärtsilä has only recently begun to offer V14 versions of its latest engine models, the 31, 46F, and 46DF.

In the past, V14 engines have also been offered by other manufacturers. Between 1982 and 1987 nineteen SA-15 arctic cargo ships were built with two 14-cylinder Wärtsilä-Sulzer 14ZV40/48 engines producing . SEMT Pielstick, nowadays part of MAN B&W, also produced four-stroke engines with 14 cylinders in V-configuration (14PC2 and 14PC4). They were used for example on RFA Bayleaf, a Leaf-class support tanker of the Royal Fleet Auxiliary.

See also 
 Straight-14 engine

References 

14
Piston engine configurations
14-cylinder engines